Joe Anthony Cobb (born 13 October 1990) is an English professional footballer who plays as a defender for Shepshed Dynamo in the Midland Football League.

Career
Left-back Cobb signed a one-year deal with Wycombe Wanderers on 30 June 2009, following his release from Leicester City. He made his debut for Wycombe in the Football League Trophy against Northampton Town on 1 September, replacing Craig Woodman as a substitute in the 46th minute. Cobb was released from Wycombe at the end of the 2009–10 season making one club appearance against Leeds United.

At the start of the 2010–11 season, Cobb signed for the Spanish club Jerez CF.

References

External links

1990 births
Footballers from Leicester
Living people
English footballers
Association football defenders
Leicester City F.C. players
Wycombe Wanderers F.C. players
Hinckley United F.C. players